Dai Weimin (born May 1962) is a former officer in the Chinese People's Liberation Army. He obtained the rank of major general (Shao Jiang) in 2010 and served as deputy dean at the PLA Nanjing Political College. He was investigated by the PLA's anti-graft agency in November 2014.

Life and career
Dai was born and raised in Xuancheng, Anhui province. During the early 1980s, he entered the East China Normal University, studying library science under He Jinduo and Liu Zhongtao. Then he earned a Doctor of Literature degree from Fudan University.

In the early 1990s, he was assigned to Air Force Institute of Politics of Shanghai, and he served as Library curator and director of Information Management Department of People's Liberation Army Nanjing Political College, Shanghai.

He served as deputy head of Training Department of PLA Nanjing Political College in 2006, and four years later promoted to the head position.

In 2013, he was promoted again to become the deputy dean at the People's Liberation Army Nanjing Political College.

In November 2014, he was taken away by the People's Liberation Army's prosecution organs.

References

1962 births
People from Xuancheng
East China Normal University alumni
Fudan University alumni
Living people
People's Liberation Army generals from Anhui